Dadasiba is a village in the Kangra district of Himachal Pradesh, India. A government Industrial Training Institute is based there. Dadasiba's postal code is 177106 and people of Dadasiba Village use Pahari Language for communication.

There is a Radha Krishan temple, which was built by Raja Ram Singh of Sibaia/Sapehiya clan, known for its murals, dating back about two hundred years to a time when the village was the centre of an independent state. One of the palaces of Raja Ram Singh, is also situated in this village 

There is one more temple in this area named Baba Bharthari g temple situated in gurnwar sub village of the dada siba tehsil, it is on the top of the hill and mid of the forest, the view of dharamshala from here is to see a beautiful heaven

The winter seasons is moderately cold with average temperature 8-14°C.
But summer season is quite hot with temperature touching 42°C.

References

Villages in Kangra district